Richard Pevear and Larissa Volokhonsky are literary translators best known for their collaborative English translations of classic Russian literature. Individually, Pevear has also translated into English works from French, Italian, and Greek. The couple's collaborative translations have been nominated three times and twice won the PEN/Book-of-the-Month Club Translation Prize (for Tolstoy's Anna Karenina and Dostoevsky's The Brothers Karamazov). Their translation of Dostoevsky's The Idiot also won the first Efim Etkind Translation Prize.

Richard Pevear

Richard Pevear was born in Waltham, Massachusetts, on 21 April 1943. Pevear earned a B.A. degree from Allegheny College in 1964, and a M.A. degree from the University of Virginia in 1965. He has taught at the University of New Hampshire, The Cooper Union, Mount Holyoke College, Columbia University, and the University of Iowa. In 1998, he joined the faculty of the American University of Paris (AUP), where he taught courses in Russian literature and translation. In 2007, he was named Distinguished Professor of Comparative Literature at AUP, and in 2009 he became Distinguished Professor Emeritus. Besides translating Russian classics, Pevear also translated from the French (Alexandre Dumas, Yves Bonnefoy, Jean Starobinski), Italian (Alberto Savinio), Spanish, and Greek (Aias, by Sophocles, in collaboration with Herbert Golder). He is also the author of two books of poems (Night Talk and Other Poems, and Exchanges). Pevear is mostly known for his work in collaboration with Larissa Volokhonsky on translation of Russian classics.

Larissa Volokhonsky

Larissa Volokhonsky was born into a Jewish family in Leningrad, now St. Petersburg, on 1 October 1945. After graduating from Leningrad State University with a degree in mathematical linguistics, she worked in the Institute of Marine Biology (Vladivostok) and travelled extensively in Sakhalin Island and Kamchatka (1968-1973). Volokhonsky emigrated to Israel in 1973, where she lived for two years. Having moved to the United States in 1975, she studied at Yale Divinity School (1977-1979) and at St Vladimir's Orthodox Theological Seminary (1979-1981), where her professors were the Orthodox theologians Alexander Schmemann and John Meyendorff. She completed her studies of theology with the diploma of Master of Divinity from Yale University. She began collaboration with her husband Richard Pevear in 1985. Larissa Volokhonsky translated from English into Russian "For the Life of the World" by Alexander Schmemann (RBR,Inc, 1982) and "Introduction to Patristic Theology" by John Meyendorff (RBR,Inc, 1981) Both translations are still in print in Russia. Together with Richard Pevear she translated into English some poetry and prose by her brother, Anri Volokhonsky (published in: Modern Poetry in Translation, New series. Ed. Daniel Weissbort. Vol 10, Winter 196, Grand Street,Spring 1989, ed. Ben Sonnenberg). Together with Emily Grossholz, she translated several poems by Olga Sedakova (Hudson Review, Vol. 61, Issue 4, Winter 2009). Volokhonsky is mostly known for her work in collaboration with Richard Pevear on translation of Russian classics.

Collaboration

Volokhonsky met Pevear in the United States in 1976 and they married six years later. The couple now live in Paris and have two trilingual children.

Pevear and Volokhonsky began working together when Pevear was reading Dostoevsky's The Brothers Karamazov and Volokhonsky noticed what she regarded to be the inadequacy of the translation by David Magarshack. As a result, the couple collaborated on their own version, producing three sample chapters which they sent to publishers. They were turned down by Random House and Oxford University Press but received encouragement from a number of Slavic scholars and were in the end accepted by North Point Press, a small publishing house in San Francisco who paid them a $1,000 advance. It went on to win a PEN/Book-of-the-Month Club Translation Prize.  Their translation of Anna Karenina won another PEN/BOMC Translation Prize. Oprah Winfrey chose this translation of Anna Karenina as a selection for her "Oprah's Book Club" on her television program, which led to a major increase in sales of this translation and greatly increased recognition for Pevear and Volokhonsky. Their translation of Dostoevsky's The Idiot won the first Efim Etkind Translation Prize awarded by the European University of St. Petersburg.

The husband-and-wife team works in a two-step process: Volokhonsky prepares her English version of the original text, trying to follow Russian syntax and stylistic peculiarities as closely as possible, and Pevear turns this version into polished and stylistically appropriate English. Pevear has variously described their working process as follows:

"Larissa goes over it, raising questions. And then we go over it again. I produce another version, which she reads against the original. We go over it one more time, and then we read it twice more in proof."

"We work separately at first. Larissa produces a complete draft, following the original as closely as possible, with many marginal comments and observations. From that, plus the original Russian, I make my own complete draft. Then we work closely together to arrive at a third draft, on which we make our 'final' revisions."

Volokhonsky and Pevear were interviewed about the art of translation for Ideas, the long running Canadian Broadcasting Company (CBC) radio documentary. It was a 3-part program called "In Other Words" and involved discussions with many leading translators. The program was podcast in April 2007. Their translation of Leo Tolstoy's War and Peace was published on 16 October 2007 by Alfred A. Knopf. It was the subject of a month-long discussion in the "Reading Room" site of The New York Times Book Review. On October 18, 2007, they appeared at the New York Public Library in conversation with Keith Gessen to celebrate the publication.

Their translation of Svetlana Alexievich's book The Unwomanly Face of War: An Oral History of Women in World War II was published in 2017.

Reception
Pevear and Volokhonsky have won awards for their translations and garnered a lot of critical praise. Writing in the Los Angeles Times, professor of Slavic languages and translator Michael Henry Heim praised their Fyodor Dostoevsky translations, stating "the reason they have succeeded so well in bringing Dostoevsky into English is not that they have made him sound bumpy or unnatural but that they have managed to capture and differentiate the characters' many voices."  George Woodcock, a literary critic and essayist, wrote in The Sewanee Review that their Dostoevsky translations "have recaptured the rough and vulgar edge of Dostoevsky's style... [T]his tone of the vulgar that [made] Dostoevsky's writings... sometimes so poignantly sufficient and sometimes so morbidly excessive... [They have] retranslat[ed] Dostoevsky into a vernacular equal to his own." In 2007, critic James Wood wrote in The New Yorker that their Dostoevsky translations are "justly celebrated" and argued that previous translators of Leo Tolstoy's work had "sidestepp[ed] difficult words, smooth[ed] the rhythm of the Russian, and eliminat[ed] one of Tolstoy's most distinctive elements, repetition," whereas Pevear and Volokhonsky's translation of War and Peace captured the "spirit and order of the book." Literary critic Harold Bloom admired Pevear and Volokhonsky's translations of Russian classics, writing in his posthumously published book The Bright Book of Life: Novels to Read and Reread that he is "among their thousands of grateful debtors."

However, their work has not been without negative criticism. Writing in The New York Review of Books in 2016, the critic Janet Malcolm argued that Pevear and Volokhonsky "have established an industry of taking everything they can get their hands on written in Russian and putting it into flat, awkward English". Some translators have voiced similar criticism, both in Russia and in the English-speaking world. The Slavic studies scholar Gary Saul Morson has written in Commentary that Pevear and Volokhonsky translations "take glorious works and reduce them to awkward and unsightly muddles". Criticism has been focused on the excessive literalness of the couple's translations and the perception that they miss the original tone of the authors.

Their 2010 translation of Boris Pasternak's Doctor Zhivago met with adverse criticism from Pasternak's niece, Ann Pasternak Slater, in a book review for The Guardian, but earned praise for "powerful fidelity" from Angela Livingstone, a Ph.D. and translator who has translated some of Pasternak's writings into English, in The Times Literary Supplement.

Bibliography

Translations credited to Pevear and Volokhonsky 
Fyodor Dostoevsky
 The Brothers Karamazov (1990)
 Crime and Punishment (1992)
 Notes from Underground (1993)
 Demons (1994)
 The Eternal Husband and Other Stories (1997)
 A Nasty Anecdote
 The Eternal Husband
 Bobok
 The Meek One
 The Dream of a Ridiculous Man
 The Idiot (2002)
 The Adolescent (2003)
 The Double (2005)
 The Gambler (2005)
 Notes from a Dead House (2015)

Svetlana Alexievich
 The Unwomanly Face of War (2017)

Mikhail Bulgakov
 The Master and Margarita (1997)

Nikolai Gogol
 The Collected Tales (1998)
 Dead Souls (1996)
 "The Inspector" With Richard Nelson (2014)

Nikolai Leskov
 The Enchanted Wanderer: and Other Stories (2013)

Boris Pasternak
 Doctor Zhivago (2010)

Alexander Pushkin
 Novels, Tales, Journeys: The Complete Prose of Alexander Pushkin (2016)
 Boris Godunov, Little Tragedies, and Others: The Complete Plays (2023)

Leo Tolstoy
 What Is Art? (1996)
 Anna Karenina (2000)
 War and Peace (2007)
 The Death of Ivan Ilyich and Other Stories (2009)
 Hadji Murat (2012)

Anton Chekhov
 Selected Stories of Anton Chekhov (2000) - 30 short stories in total. 
 The Complete Short Novels (2000)
 The Cherry Orchard (2015) With Richard Nelson
 Uncle Vanya with Richard Nelson, premiered 10 February 2018 at Old Globe Theater,
 The Seagull (2017) with Richard Nelson
 Three Sisters (2020) with Richard Nelson
 Ivanov (2022) with Richard Nelson
 Fifty Two Stories (2020) - 52 previously untranslated stories

Ivan Turgenev
 A Month in the Country (2012) With Richard Nelson

Mother Maria Skobtsova
Essential Writings (2002)

Translations credited to Pevear 
Alain
 The Gods (1974)

Jose Vincente Ortuño
 Bitter Roots (1978)

Jacques Mercier
 Ethiopian Magic Scrolls (1979)

Yves Bonnefoy
 Poems 1959-1975 (1985)
 Early Poems 1947-1959 (1991) - co-translated with Galway Kinnell 

Alberto Savinio
 Childhood of Nivasio Dolcemare (1987)
 Signor Dido: Stories (2014)

Samuil Marshak
 The Pup Grew Up! (1989) - illustrated by Vladimir Radunsky
 Hail to Mail (1990) - illustrated by Vladimir Radunsky

Sophocles
 Aias (Ajax) (1999) - co-translated with Herbert Golder

Alexandre Dumas
 The Three Musketeers (2006)

Olga Medvedkova
 Going Where (2018)

Pevear's book Translating Music (2007) contains his translation of Alexander Pushkin's  poem "The Tale of the Preacher and His Man Bumpkin". 

Pevear commented in the introduction of his translation of The Three Musketeers that most modern translations available today are "textbook examples of bad translation practices" which "give their readers an extremely distorted notion of Dumas' writing."

Notes

Sources

External links
  Pevear at American University of Paris (Archive)
 American University of Paris page on Pevear
 Resume from University of Bologna website
 
 

 John Biguenet, "Better a Live Sparrow than a Stuffed Owl", a conversation with Richard Pevear and Larissa Volokhonsky, Tin House N°63, Spring 2015.

Living people
French–English translators
Russian–English translators
Italian–English translators
Writers from Saint Petersburg
Russian expatriates in France
Russian expatriates in Israel
Translators of Boris Pasternak
Translators of Fyodor Dostoyevsky
Translators of Leo Tolstoy
Year of birth missing (living people)